Bill Kerr (1 September 1882 – 16 February 1911) was an Australian rules footballer who played with Essendon and South Melbourne in the Victorian Football League (VFL). He died from typhoid fever at the age of 28.

'Bubs' Kerr also played 22 games and kicked 16 goals for Williamstown in the VFA in 1906 and 1910, the last season before he tragically died.

Notes

External links 

1882 births
1911 deaths
Australian rules footballers from Melbourne
Essendon Football Club players
Sydney Swans players
Deaths from typhoid fever
Infectious disease deaths in Victoria (Australia)
People from South Melbourne